Fenghuang Maglev is a medium-low speed maglev rapid transit line in Fenghuang County, Xiangxi Prefecture, Hunan province, China. The first phase officially started operation on 30 July 2022 and connects the Fenghuanggucheng railway station on Zhangjiajie–Jishou–Huaihua high-speed railway with Fenghuangdengdai.

Description
The line operates at speeds up to 100 km/h. The ticket price is 58 yuan, allowing passengers to take unlimited times within four days. The operation time is from 9 a.m. to 9 p.m. (local time), with the 30-minute interval.

Stations
Legend
 - In operation - Reserved stations, under planning

History
On the afternoon of August 5, 2019, Wang Wuliang, Secretary of the Party committee and chairman of Hunan Rail Transit Group and chairman of Hunan Maglev Group, first came to the construction site of the project to express their sincere thanks for their hard work and efficient work, and visited the construction site of Fenghuang Maglev at Fenghuang high speed railway station, depot and Liwan tunnel.

In June 2021 it was reported that all the beam erection had been completed and 60% of the track laying was done.

Fenghuang Maglev officially opened on 30 July 2022.

References

Rail transport in Hunan
Rapid transit in China
Maglev
Monorails